Diario las Américas is the first Spanish-language newspaper founded in South Florida, the second oldest in the United States dedicated to Spanish-speaking readers, after La Opinión, in Los Angeles.
Its first copy circulated on July 4, 1953, under the direction of its founders, the brothers of Nicaraguan origin Horacio and Francisco Aguirre Baca.
Diario Las Américas has been an active member of the Inter-American Press Association (IAPA) since its foundation.

History
Diario las Américas was founded on July 4, 1953.
It began as an evening newspaper with circulation from Tuesday to Sunday. Its closing time was noon because the copies were sent by air to different cities in the United States and Latin America where it was distributed to subscribers, government offices and diplomatic headquarters, in the early hours of the morning of the following day.
In June 2006, its website was launched on the Internet, for which it partnered with "Hispanic Digital Network" who was in charge of designing and activating it.
At the end of 2012, the newspaper was acquired by the Mezerhane Group, whose president is the businessman of Venezuelan origin, Nelson J. Mezerhane G. After the start of this new stage, the Spanish journalist Manuel Aguilera, assumed the editorial direction.
Under the management of the Mezerhane group, during the first year of this new stage, Diario Las Américas underwent a graphic redesign, the first of a total image restructuring that led to the current format, tabloid 1115  that contains 32, 40 to 48 pages, all in color with print and graphic design quality that sets it apart in the media industry.
Since May 2013, its publishing deadline changed, it became a morning edition, with publication seven days a week. At this stage, new reporters and a network of collaborators in Latin America and Europe joined the newsroom.
On July 1, 2015, the journalist of Cuban origin Osmín Martínez assumed the direction of the newspaper in front of which he remained until October 2019.
As the media began to expand its operations to digital platforms, Diario Las Américas adjusted the frequency of circulation of its printed copies. First, it had printed editions three times a week, Monday, Wednesday, and Friday.
Since 2018, as part of the strategic changes adopted, Diario Las Américas began to circulate every Saturday in a weekly format. Currently, the weekly print edition circulates every Friday at all Miami-Dade and South Broward County outlets.
In November 2019, the journalist of Cuban origin Iliana Lavastida was appointed executive director of Diario Las Américas.

Management
The management team of Diario Las Américas is made up of Mashud Mezerhane and Jorge Daall, vice presidents of operations; Aquiles Presilla, director of operations; Alberto Vethencourth, director of finance; Ana Bringas, director of advertising; Isadora Gaviria, marketing director and Camilo Aguiar, distribution manager of digital content.

Newsroom
The editorial desk of Diario Las Américas is completed as managing editor, Jesús Hernández and as chief editor of digital strategy, Ricardo Moreno. The staff of editors and reporters are made up of Elkis Bejarano, Grethel Delgado, Judith Flores, Wilma Hernández, Daniel Castropé, César Menéndez, Leonardo Morales and the photo reporter Sureidy Rodríguez.
El área de diseño gráfico, encabezada por Lucía Cerboni, la integra además José J. Blanco.
The news anchor is Lieter Ledesma and the producer of audiovisual spaces is Iván Pedraza. 
The professionals who are in charge of the operation of Diario Las Américas allow with their performance that the Spanish newspaper with the longest tradition for Florida's Hispanic public, operates as a multiplatform medium. Through its website and social networks, readers receive the news when it happens, with the required immediacy and verification. In its printed editions, the most important topics are developed and researched to offer readers a documented perspective on the events.

Columnists and contributors
Diario Las Américas counts among its contributors as columnists Asdrúbal Aguiar, Jaime Bayly, Edgar C. Otálvora, Remedios Díaz Oliver, Carlos Sánchez Berzain, Oscar Elías Biscet, Orlando Gutiérrez Boronat, Orlando Viera Blanco, Ibéyise Pacheco, and Rolando Montoya, among others.

Distribution
It circulates every Friday with a weekly print edition. It also extends its digital operation to a wide and varied platform displayed on its website at ww.diariolasamericas.com and social networks. Its readers are Hispanic, mostly of Cuban, Nicaraguan, Venezuelan, and Colombian origin. Diario Las Américas maintains subscribers in other regions of Florida and the US.

Sections
·El Tema de la Semana (Topic of the Week)
·Florida (Florida)
·América Latina (Latin America)
·Cuba (Cuba)
·Venezuela (Venezuela)
·Voces de Venezuela (Venezuelan Voices)
·EEUU (USA)
·Mundo (World)
·Dinero (Money)
·Salud (Health)
·Turismo (Tourism)
·Estilo y Sociedad (Lifestyle and Society)
·Vida y Artes (Arts and Style)
·Deportes (Sports)
·Tribuna Abierta (Open Forum)
·Classificados (Classifieds)

Digital spaces
·Noticiero en 90 segundos (90 Seconds Newscast)
·En consulta con el Doctor Misael (Consultation with Dr. Misael)
·La buena noticia (The Good News)
·Cartelera cultural semanal (Weekly Cultural Bulletin Board)
·Crónicas de Facundo (Facundo Chronicles)
·Revelando Cuba (Revealing Cuba)
·Hablemos de Inmigración (Let's Talk About Immigration)
·Espacio de entrevistas Un Café con Camila (Talk Show “Coffee with Camila”)
·Espacio de entrevistas Juan al Medio (Talk Show “Juan's Forefront)
·Noticiero Resumen Semanal (Weekly News Review)
·Cápsula informativa semanal (Weekly news brief)

Headquarters
Its headquarters are located in the financial district of Miami, at 888 Brickell Avenue. 5th Floor, Miami, FL 33131, United States.

References

1953 establishments in Florida
Daily newspapers published in the United States
Hispanic and Latino American culture in Miami
Mass media in Miami
Newspapers established in 1953
Spanish-language newspapers published in Florida